The New Beginning in Osaka (2019) is a professional wrestling event promoted by New Japan Pro-Wrestling (NJPW). The event took place on February 11, 2019, in Osaka, Osaka, at the Osaka Prefectural Gymnasium and featured eight matches, two of which were contested for championships. In the main event, Hiroshi Tanahashi defended the IWGP Heavyweight Championship against Jay White. This was the seventeenth event under the New Beginning name and the seventh to take place in Osaka.

Storylines
The New Beginning in Osaka featured eight professional wrestling matches, which involved different wrestlers from pre-existing scripted feuds and storylines. The final five matches on the card feature Chaos and Main Unit wrestlers taking on Bullet Club wrestlers in singles & tag team matches. Wrestlers portray villains, heroes, or less distinguishable characters in the scripted events that build tension and culminate in a wrestling match or series of matches.

At Power Struggle (2017), Jay White made his return to NJPW under his new alias "Switchblade" and attacked Hiroshi Tanahashi challenging him for his IWGP Intercontinental Championship at Wrestle Kingdom 12, which Tanahashi won. After Wrestle Kingdom, Tanahashi would struggle in the beginning half of 2018 losing his Intercontinental Title to Minoru Suzuki at The New Beginning in Sapporo (2018), losing to Zack Sabre Jr. in the New Japan Cup final, and losing to Kazuchika Okada in an IWGP Heavyweight Championship match at Wrestling Dontaku 2018 which meant that Okada had broken Tanahashi's record of 11 straight IWGP Heavyweight Title defenses. However, White would triumph in his beginning half of 2018 joining Chaos and beating Kenny Omega at The New Beginning in Sapporo winning the IWGP United States Championship. On Night 3 of the G1 Climax, White would beat Tanahashi (being the only person to do so in the tournament). Tanahashi would end up winning the G1 beating Kota Ibushi in the final. At Destruction in Kobe, Tanahashi would successfully defend his Tokyo Dome IWGP Heavyweight Title challenge rights certificate against Okada. After the match White would attack Tanahashi and Okada, turning on Chaos and aligning himself with Okada's former manager Gedo. At King of Pro-Wrestling (2018), Tanahashi would successfully defend his challenge rights certificate against White, after the match White would join Bullet Club along with Gedo and Jado. At Road to Power Struggle, Tanahashi would join forces with Okada to combat White, dubbing themselves as the "Dream Team" they would lose all seven matches they had against White and Bullet Club over the course of the World Tag League (NJPW). At Wrestle Kingdom 13, White would defeat Okada and Tanahashi would beat Omega winning the IWGP Heavyweight Title. At New Year Dash!!, White would challenge Tanahashi for the IWGP Title for The New Beginning in Osaka, at The New beginning in Sapporo White would make Tanahashi tap out with his new finisher the T.T.O. (Tanahashi Tapped Out).

Results

References

External links
The New Beginning at NJPW.co.jp

NJPW The New Beginning
2019 in professional wrestling
Events in Osaka
February 2019 events in Japan
Professional wrestling in Osaka